Cag Shield is an event organised annually by Communication Arts Guild, Mumbai.

It started in 1980 as a three-sport tournament of three C’s - Carrom, Chess and Cricket. The only sport that caught on with all the agencies and still carries on the trend was Cricket. Cag had a deep connection with individual designers because of the awards and workshops or seminars but they wanted to grow bigger. The soul aim of the event was to unite the varied agencies, their employees and their teams into a cordial play. Initial agencies which participated were O&M (then Benson), JWT, Grant Advertising, ASP and Sista’s. Eventually it grew such popularity that it was even officially registered with the Mumbai Cricket Association.

In 2007, Vyas Giannetti Creative Sports took the initiative to rebrand Cag Shield. There was a pre-tournament blitz created which included the launch of a book titled, ‘A Different Pitch’. The book showcases the journey of Cag Shield through the years. There are testimonials from associated admen like Piyush Pandey and Madhukar Kamath and cricket players including Harsha Bhogle and Kapil Dev. The latter also wrote the Foreword for the book.

References

Indian domestic cricket competitions
Cricket in Mumbai